Stuttgart-Nord is an inner city borough in the north of Stuttgart.

Geography
Stuttgart-Nord extends from the Doggenburg to the highest point, the Gähkopf (409 m above sea level) to the Bismarckturm, on the Killesberg and the Pragsattel to Rosenstein Park and the Pragfriedhof. The Pragsattel located at the lowest point of a ridge from Killesberg to Burgholzhof.

One finds in Stuttgart-Nord numerous good residential areas and viewpoints on the Stuttgart city center. Noteworthy streets are: Am Bismarckturm, Am Gähkopf, Caesar Flaischlen Street, Eduard-Pfeiffer-Straße, Feuerbacher Heide, Lenzhalde, Robert-Bosch-Straße and Schottstraße.

History

Stuttgart-North was created when Stuttgart was divided into districts in 1956. The western boundary of this new district extended from the Doggenburg to Weißenhof and Killesberg. When the districts were reorganised on January 1, 2001, Stuttgart-North was split into 11 subdistricts.

References

Districts of Stuttgart